Frederick Alexander Szarvasy (1875 – 3 July 1948) was a Hungarian-born British financier. He became one of the leading financiers and industrialists in Britain.

Life
Frederick Szarvasy was born in Hungary, the son of Alexander Szarvasy, a banker. After spending some time in South America, he arrived in London around 1901 and worked for Montagu Oppenheimer.

Szarvasy quickly rose to prominence and gained a reputation for salvaging companies that were undermined by excessive debt. When Dunlop Rubber faced bankruptcy in 1921, Szarvasy was appointed as chairman and managing director.

Szarvasy was described by an American trade magazine as "the most daring and successful financier in London" in 1923.

In 1924 he played a leading role in the foundation of Imperial Airways.

In 1928 Szarvasy acquired United Anthracite Collieries from Lord Melchett. As such, he gained control of 80 percent of South Wales's anthracite supply.

Szarvasy died suddenly at his London home on 3 July 1948.

References

1875 births
1948 deaths
Hungarian financial businesspeople
Hungarian Roman Catholics
Austro-Hungarian emigrants to the United Kingdom